Himlen runt hörnet is the first studio album by Swedish singer Lisa Nilsson. The album was awarded a Grammis Award in the  "album" of the year. category and a Rockbjörnen award in the "Swedish record of the year" category. The album was also recorded in an English language-version, as "Ticket to Heaven". Himlen runt hörnet peaked at number one on the Swedish Albums Chart and number 11 on the Norwegian Albums Chart.

Track listing
Himlen runt hörnet - 5:03
Aldrig, aldrig, aldrig - 4:56
Du (92) - 4.45
Ändå faller regnet - 4:36
Varje gång jag ser dig - 4:06
Här kommer han -   4:01 
Om du har något hjärta - 3.55
Allt jag behöver - 4:59
Vem - 2.50
Försiktigt - 6:09

Contributors
David Wilczewski -saxophone
Johan Ekelund - keyboard
Mattias Torell - guitar
Lasse Andersson - bass, electric piano
Per Lindvall - drums

Charts

References 

1992 albums
Lisa Nilsson albums